Ryan Shellow (born October 10, 1997) is an American soccer player who plays as a goalkeeper for Detroit City in the USL Championship.

Career

Youth & College
Shellow played two years of high school soccer at Gulliver Preparatory School, before playing club soccer with Pinecrest Premier SC and later USSDA side Kendall SC, where he stayed for three years. At Pinecrest, Shellow captained the side as they played in the Region III Premier League and National League. He was also a member of the Florida Olympic Development State Team, and was named an Interregional All-Star at the 2010 Thanksgiving Showcase.

In 2016, Shellow attended Cornell University to play college soccer. In four seasons with Big Red, Shellow made 47 appearances. Shellow led the Ivy League in total saves in two of his four seasons, making 70 saves in his freshman and junior seasons. For his senior year campaign, Shellow started in 12 games, only allowing 13 goals, making 31 saves, and finishing the season with a .705 save percentage.

While at college, Shellow also appeared in the USL League Two with Weston FC and Lakeland Tropics.

FC Tucson
On February 22, 2021, Shellow signed his first professional contract with USL League One side FC Tucson. However, he didn't appear for Tucson during 2021 and wasn't announced as a returnee at the conclusion of the season.

Detroit City 
On March 11, 2022, USL Championship side Detroit City  announced they'd signed Shellow to a one-year deal. He made his professional debut on September 10, 2022, starting in a 2–1 win over Colorado Springs Switchbacks. On March 6, 2023, Detroit announced Shellow had re-signed with the club for their 2023 season.

References

External links 
 Cornell profile

1997 births
Living people
American soccer players
Association football goalkeepers
Cornell Big Red men's soccer players
Detroit City FC players
Florida Tropics SC players
Soccer players from Florida
Soccer players from Miami
FC Tucson players
USL Championship players
USL League Two players
Weston FC players